Patriarch of Kyiv may refer to:
 Patriarch of the former Ukrainian Orthodox Church - Kyiv Patriarchate
 Patriarch of the former Ukrainian Autocephalous Orthodox Church - Kyiv Patriarchate
 Patriarch of the Ukrainian Autocephalous Orthodox Church - Canonical, head of a distinctive church in Ukraine
 Patriarch of the Ukrainian Orthodox Greek Catholic Church, head of a distinctive church in Ukraine
 Head of the Ukrainian Greek Catholic Church or, unofficially, Ukrainian Greek Catholic Patriarch of Kyiv

See also 
 Archeparchy of Kyiv (disambiguation)
 Bishop of Kyiv (disambiguation)
 Eparchy of Kyiv (disambiguation)
 List of Metropolitans and Patriarchs of Kyiv 
 Metropolitan of Kiev and all Rus'
 Patriarchate of Kyiv (disambiguation)